John Joseph Vidacovich Jr. (born June 27, 1949) is an American jazz drummer and a member of the band Astral Project with  James Singleton, Tony Dagradi, and Steve Masakowski.

He has also worked with Bobby McFerrin, Stanton Moore, Charlie Hunter, Willy DeVille, Robert Walter, Mose Allison, Johnny Adams, Professor Longhair, James Booker, and Alvin Tyler. He began teaching at Loyola University New Orleans in 1982.

Discography
 Mystery Street (Chebasco, 1995)
 Banks Street (Chebasco, 1996)
 Vidacovich (Paw Maw, 2002) 
 We Came to Play with June Yamagishi, George Porter Jr. (Trio, 2003) 
  'bout Time (Paw Maw, 2020)

With Ray Anderson
Blues Bred in the Bone (Enja, 1988)

With John Scofield
Flat Out (Gramavision, 1989)

Awards and honors

 Lifetime Achievement in Music (2020, Gambit'''s Big Easy Entertainment Award)
 Best Drummer (12 wins between 1997 and 2018, OffBeat magazine's Best of the Beat Award)
 Lifetime Achievement Award (2016, OffBeat)
 Best Contemporary Jazz Drummer (1995 and 1996, OffBeat)
 Best Contemporary Jazz Album: Banks Street (1996, OffBeat)
 Best Contemporary Jazz Album: Mystery Street (1995, OffBeat'')

References

External links
Official website: Astral Project
Johnny Vidacovich Interview NAMM Oral History Library (2017)

1949 births
American jazz percussionists
Astral Project members
Jazz musicians from New Orleans
Living people
Loyola University New Orleans faculty
American jazz drummers